Tebas may refer to:
 Tebas (architect), Brazilian engineer, architect and stonemason 
 Javier Tebas, Spanish lawyer and president of Liga Nacional de Fútbol Profesional